The International Association of Physics Students (IAPS) is a non-profit umbrella organization for physics students associations. Its official seat is in Mulhouse, France in the headquarters of the European Physical Society. It was founded in 1987 in Debrecen, Hungary.

Introduction 
IAPS is an association of physics students and student societies from around the globe, working to promote peaceful collaboration amongst its members. These are represented by national and local committees, who meet regularly to ensure the relevance of activities.
Since 1987, IAPS has worked continuously to support friendly relations and collaboration between physics students. The group supports its members in their academic and professional work by discussing and acting on scientific, social and cultural issues. IAPS is a recognised non-governmental organisation run entirely by students from around the world.

IAPS runs an annual International Conference of Physics Students (ICPS), one of the biggest student organized conferences in the world. IAPS also organizes visits to global research institutions such as CERN or Culham Centre for Fusion Energy, international physics competitions, summer schools, exchange programmes and multinational meetings.

On a daily basis, IAPS is run by an Executive Committee, which is elected at the Annual General Meeting (AGM), held during the ICPS with the participation of all member societies. Most of the activities are run through the help of student volunteers, whose collaboration is necessary to ensure that all activities are offered at prices that allow participation from countries with weaker economies.

Throughout its existence, IAPS has been accumulating a number of partnerships with several international organizations. Between the most long-standing collaborators stand the European Physical Society (EPS) and the International Union of Pure and Applied Physics (IUPAP). IAPS continuously pursues collaborative partnership efforts with other organizations to have a positive impact in the global scientific community.

Structure 
IAPS is run by an Executive Committee, which is elected at the Annual General Meeting (AGM). IAPS members may be national physics student organisations, called National Committees (NC), physics student association localised at one university or city, called Local Committees (LC) and individual members (IM) if none of the before are present where one studies. In a broad sense, all the members of NCs and LCs, as well as IMs, are members of IAPS. Membership costs are calculated for each applicant based on the type of committee and the GDP of applicant countries.

Executive committee 
The IAPS Executive Committee (EC) is currently composed of 9 students, elected between representatives of the different member societies. The 2022/23 EC is composed of:

National Committees

Local Committees

Individual Members
Students of physics or related subjects who do not have access to an NC or LC may join as IMs. Only IAPS members may attend IAPS events such as ICPS. Currently IAPS has around 150 individual members.

Honorary Members
The following people were elected Honorary Fellows by an IAPS AGM:
 Sir Arnold Wolfendale
 Sir Joseph Rotblat (Nobel Laureate), died in 2005
 Patroklosz Budai (2005)
 Tamás Fülöp (2005)
 Ákos Horváth (2005)
 Péter Lévai (2005)
 Péter Ván (2005)
 Jim Grozier (2008)

Programs

International Conference of Physics Students
ICPS International Conference of Physics Students is the International Conference of Physics Students, which is the main event of IAPS, organized yearly by one of its member committees. The purpose of the conference is to create an opportunity for physics students from all around the world to come together, to talk about science and life, to practice presenting their research and, all in all, to have a great time.

The first ICPS was organized by students of the Eötvös Loránd University, in Budapest, Hungary in the year 1986. The event had less than fifty participants, but since then, the conference has grown considerably, nowadays bringing together more than four hundred students.

The one week of the conference has its fair share of scientific, social and touristic programs. One gets a chance to listen to and give lectures on various topics in physics, to check out the laboratories of the host city, to make friends with physics students from all around the world, to get a little glimpse of the foreign cultures that gather here, and to see another part of the world.

The following were venues of the ICPS conferences:

In addition, IAPS organizers a number of other events. In 2018, IAPS associated with the International Students of History Association (ISHA) in a Series of Conferences named HyPe (HistorY and Physics Experience), that took place in Bologna, Italy.

Excursions 
Since its foundation, IAPS has organised several trips to international research facilities, either directly or through its member societies.

iaps2CERN 
IAPS yearly organises annual tours to CERN, in Geneva (Switzerland). The highly successful iaps2CERN programme usually has approximately 40 participants, representing up to 20 different nationalities. The tour usually comprises visits of the CERN exhibitions, some of the experiments currently accessible and also a visit of the United Nations offices in Geneva.

International Physics Competitions 
PLANCKS is an annual international physics contest for bachelor and master students. It is usually a three day event and can include in addition to the competition itself scientific program like a symposium and excursions, as well as social events and the award ceremony. PLANCKS is arranged by different IAPS member committees.

In May 2014, the A-Eskwadraat student association held the first PLANCKS edition in Utrecht.
Since then, it took place every year at varying places:

IAPS also support other physics competitions, such as the Ortvay competition (organised by the Hungarian NC) and the International Physics Tournament.

References

External links
 Official IAPS Website
 List of IAPS members
 IAPS Executive Committee

1987 establishments in Hungary
Physics
Physics education
Physics organizations
Organisations based in Debrecen
Student organizations in France